Sex Quartet (US title: The Queens, 'the fairies') is a 1966 Italian-French comedy film directed by Mario Monicelli, Mauro Bolognini, Antonio Pietrangeli and Luciano Salce. It starred Capucine, Claudia Cardinale, Monica Vitti and Raquel Welch.

Plot
Four unrelated shorts by four different directors. "Queen Sabina" chronicles the sexual misadventures of a teenage girl on the road home. "Queen Armenia" centers on a self-saving opportunistic gypsy babysitter who uses her employer's kids for her own gain. The third episode, "Queen Elena" centers on a husband who learns a lesson about the perils of infidelity after he succumbs to the wiles of the seductive wife next door. The last vignette, "Queen Marta" centers on a wealthy woman who, when drunk, uses her butler as an outlet for her lust.

Cast
 Monica Vitti as Sabina (segment "Fata Sabina")
 Enrico Maria Salerno as Gianni (segment "Fata Sabina")
 Claudia Cardinale as Armenia (segment "Fata Armenia")
 Gastone Moschin as Dr. Aldini (segment "Fata Armenia")
 Raquel Welch as Elena (segment "Fata Elena")
 Jean Sorel as Luigi (segment "Fata Elena")
 Alberto Sordi as Giovanni (segment "Fata Marta")
 Capucine as Marta (segment "Fata Marta")
 Olga Villi as Countess Rattazzi (segment "Fata Marta")
 Anthony Steel as The Professor (segment "Fata Marta")
 Renzo Giovampietro as 2nd Motorist (segment "Fata Sabina")
 Corrado Olmi as Aldini's Friend (segment "Fata Armenia")
 Gigi Ballista as The Priest (segment "Fata Marta")
 Clotilde Sakaroff as The Governess (segment "Fata Elena") (as Clothilde Sakharoff)
 Nino Marchetti as The Guest (segment "Fata Marta")
 Franco Morici as (segment "Fata Elena")

References

External links

1966 films
1960s Italian-language films
1966 comedy films
Films directed by Mario Monicelli
Films directed by Mauro Bolognini
Films directed by Antonio Pietrangeli
Films directed by Luciano Salce
Films set in Rome
Films with screenplays by Suso Cecchi d'Amico
Films with screenplays by Ruggero Maccari
Films scored by Armando Trovajoli
Italian comedy films
1960s Italian films